On the Content and Object of Presentations ("On the Doctrine of the Content and Object of Presentations") is an 1894 book by the Polish philosopher Kazimierz Twardowski, a student of the philosopher Franz Brentano.

Reception
The philosopher Reinhardt Grossmann has observed that On the Content and Object of Presentations greatly influenced the course of philosophy. The philosopher Alexius Meinong adopted Twardowski's distinction between the individual mental act, its content and its object, and his contention that there are many objects of acts that do not exist. This helped Meinong to clearly separate presentations from the objects which they intend.

Editions
English translation
 Kasimir Twardowski, On the Content and Object of Presentations. A Psychological Investigation, translation and introduction by Reinhardt Grossmann, The Hague: Martinus Nijhoff, 1977.

References

Bibliography
Books

 

1894 non-fiction books
Books by Kazimierz Twardowski
Metaphysics of mind
Philosophy of mind literature